Dyschloropsis is a genus of moths in the family Geometridae.

Species
 Dyschloropsis impararia (Guenée, 1857)

References

 Dyschloropsis at Markku Savela's Lepidoptera and Some Other Life Forms
 Natural History Museum Lepidoptera genus database

Hemitheini
Geometridae genera